John Henry Ryan (1865 - 1943) was a businessman, newspaperman, and state legislator in the U.S. state of Washington. He lived in Tacoma, Washington. He was a member of the NAACP. He was elected as a member of three different political parties.

He and his wife published The Weekly and then The Forum newspapers.

William Owen Bush was the first African American to serve in Washington’s legislature.  Charles Stokes was elected to the legislature in the early 1950s.

See also
List of African-American officeholders (1900–1959)
Rosa Gourdine Franklin

References

African-American state legislators in Washington (state)
African-American businesspeople
1865 births
1943 deaths